El jefe infiltrado is a 2014 Spanish reality television series based on the British series Undercover Boss. Each episode follows a person in a high management position at a major business who poses as an entry-level employee to discover faults in the company. The first series premiered on 3 April 2014.

Format 
Each episode features a high-ranking executive or the owner of a corporation going undercover as an entry-level employee in their own company. The executives alter their appearance and assume an alias and fictional back-story. The fictitious explanation given for the accompanying camera crew is that the executives are being filmed as part of a documentary about entry-level workers in a particular industry. They spend approximately one week undercover, working in various areas of their company operations, with a different job and in most cases a different location each day. They are exposed to a series of predicaments with amusing results, and invariably spend time getting to know the people who work in the company, learning about their professional and personal challenges.

At the end of their week undercover, the executives return to their true identity and request the employees they worked with individually to corporate headquarters. The bosses reveal their identity, and reward hard-working employees through campaign, promotion, or financial rewards, while other employees are given training or better working conditions.

Episodes 
The first series has featured 6 episodes. The series premiered on 3 April 2014.

Series 1: 2014

References

External links 
 
 Watch on-line (only available in Spain)

Undercover Boss
2014 Spanish television seasons
LaSexta original programming